Coarsegold is a census-designated place in Madera County, California, United States. The population was 4,144 at the 2020 census, up from 1,840 in 2010. The Picayune Rancheria of Chukchansi Indians, a federally recognized tribe, is headquartered in Coarsegold.

History
Coarsegold has previously had several names, including "Coarse Gold", "Gold Gulch", "Michaels", "Oro Grosso", "Texas Flat", and "Coarse Gold Gulch". The place was first called "Texas Flat" after miners from Texas discovered gold there in 1849. By 1874, the name had changed to "Michaels", honoring Charles Michaels, a local merchant. A rival mining camp inhabited by Mexicans there was called "Oro Grosso", the Spanish translation of "coarse gold".

The current name derives from the California Gold Rush of the mid-19th century, when prospectors discovered coarse nuggets of gold in a nearby creek. At one time, several dozen gold mines operated in the area.

The Coarse Gold Gulch post office opened in 1878, changed the name to "Goldgulch" in 1895 and to "Coarsegold" in 1899.

Geography 
Nearby communities include Oakhurst  to the north and Yosemite Lakes Park the same distance to the southwest.

The area is drained by Coarse Gold Creek, a south-flowing tributary of the Fresno River.

Climate
Coarsegold has a Mediterranean climate (Csa according to the Köppen climate classification system) with hot, dry summers and cool, wet winters. It is located in hardiness zone 8b.

Demographics

The 2010 United States Census reported that Coarsegold had a population of 1,840. The racial makeup of Coarsegold was 1,617 (87.9%) White, 11 (0.6%) African American, 50 (2.7%) Native American, 32 (1.7%) Asian, 6 (0.3%) Pacific Islander, 47 (2.6%) from other races, and 77 (4.2%) from two or more races. Hispanic or Latino of any race were 156 persons (8.5%).

The Census reported that 1,840 people (100% of the population) lived in households, 0 (0%) lived in non-institutionalized group quarters, and 0 (0%) were institutionalized.

There were 766 households, out of which 184 (24.0%) had children under the age of 18 living in them, 452 (59.0%) were opposite-sex married couples living together, 70 (9.1%) had a female householder with no husband present, 28 (3.7%) had a male householder with no wife present.  There were 29 (3.8%) unmarried opposite-sex partnerships, and 4 (0.5%) same-sex married couples or partnerships. 186 households (24.3%) were made up of individuals, and 104 (13.6%) had someone living alone who was 65 years of age or older. The average household size was 2.40.  There were 550 families (71.8% of all households); the average family size was 2.79.

The population was spread out, with 338 people (18.4%) under the age of 18, 116 people (6.3%) aged 18 to 24, 295 people (16.0%) aged 25 to 44, 585 people (31.8%) aged 45 to 64, and 506 people (27.5%) who were 65 years of age or older.  The median age was 52.3 years. For every 100 females, there were 91.1 males.  For every 100 females age 18 and over, there were 88.0 males.

The homeowner vacancy rate was 2.8%; the rental vacancy rate was 5.7%.  1,492 people (81.1% of the population) lived in owner-occupied housing units and 348 people (18.9%) lived in rental housing units.

Culture
Chukchansi language classes have been taught at the elementary school in Coarsegold since 2008. As of 2012, Chukchansi classes are available for children and adults.

Every year from mid-October to mid-November, tarantula mating season takes place and the town is full of tarantulas. Locals go out of their way to protect and respect the arachnids during this time. A Coarsegold Tarantula Festival is held in late October, traditionally the Saturday before Halloween, including tarantula racing, a competition for the hairiest legs of both men and women, and a pumpkin dessert contest.

Notable residents
 Creed Bratton, actor and musician; raised in Coarsegold
 Richard Kiel, actor; lived in Coarsegold from 1980 to 2002
 Lee Newton, actress; raised in Coarsegold
 Anthony Ruiz, mixed martial artist
 Grace Lee Whitney, actress; lived in Coarsegold from 1993 until her death in 2015

Media
The 1993 computer-based adventure game Freddy Pharkas: Frontier Pharmacist is set in a fictionalized Coarsegold in the 1880s. The game was published by Sierra On-Line, which was, at the time, based in nearby Oakhurst; the same company, under its prior name On-Line Systems, in 1981 published On-Line Adventure #3: Cranston Manor, also set in Coarsegold.

The Coarsegold (Coarse Gold) mining site is the destination for stars Joel McCrea and Randolph Scott in the 1962 film Ride the High Country.

References

External links
 Coarsegold visitors' website
 Coarsegold Chamber of Commerce

Census-designated places in Madera County, California
Census-designated places in California